Suho Polje (Cyrillic: Сухо Поље), also known as Suvo Polje ( Cyrillic: Суво Поље) is a place located south-west of the city Bijeljina in Republika Srpska, Bosnia and Herzegovina.  To the east of Suho Polje is Modran and to the north is Zagoni.

About
The 1991 census showed Suho Polje had 1,503 inhabitants. 1,443 were Serbs, 2 were Croats, 40 considered themselves Yugoslavs, and there were 18 others.

Sport
Suho Polje has a football club known as FK Jedisntvo.

References

External links
 Bijeljina official website (Serbian)

Suho Polje